The NORCECA qualification for the 2014 FIVB Volleyball Women's World Championship saw member nations compete for six places at the finals in Italy.

Draw
40 of the 41 NORCECA national teams entered qualification (Montserrat and Turks and Caicos Islands later withdrew). The teams were distributed according to their position in the NORCECA Senior Women's Confederation Rankings as of 15 January 2012 using the serpentine system for their distribution. (Rankings shown in brackets) Teams ranked 1–7 do not compete in the first and second rounds, and automatically qualify for the third rounds.

First round (AFECAVOL)

First round (CAZOVA)

First round (ECVA)

 Montserrat withdrew and Sint Maarten replaced Montserrat in Pool D to balance the number of teams in each group.

Second round

Third round

The twenty remaining teams were distributed according to their position in second round and then in the NORCECA Senior Women's Confederation Rankings as of January 2014 using the serpentine system for their distribution. (Positions in second round and NORCECA rankings shown in brackets)

Final round

First round

Pool A
Venue:  Ismay van Wilgen Sports Hall, Paramaribo, Suriname
Dates: September 1–2, 2012
All times are Suriname Time (UTC−03:00)

Preliminary round

|}

|}

Final round

3rd place

|}

Final

|}

Final standing

Pool B
Venue:  La Borie Indoor Stadium, St. George's, Grenada
Dates: June 22–23, 2012
All times are Atlantic Standard Time (UTC−04:00)

Preliminary round

|}

|}

Final round

3rd place

|}

Final

|}

Final standing

Pool C
Venue:  Ronald Charles Basketball Arena, Saint Croix, U.S. Virgin Islands
Dates: May 26–27, 2012
All times are Atlantic Standard Time (UTC−04:00)

Preliminary round

|}

|}

Final round

3rd place

|}

Final

|}

Final standing

Pool D
Venue:  Marriott Dome, Basseterre, Saint Kitts and Nevis
Dates: July 27–28, 2012
All times are Atlantic Standard Time (UTC−04:00)

Preliminary round

|}

|}

Final round

3rd place

|}

Final

|}

Final standing

Pool E
Venue:  Alfred Sangster Auditorium, Kingston, Jamaica
Dates: November 29–30, 2012
All times are Eastern Standard Time (UTC−05:00)

Preliminary round

|}

|}

Final round

3rd place

|}

Final

|}

Final standing

Pool F
Venue:  Multi-Purpose Sports Complex, Road Town, British Virgin Islands
Dates: June 9–10, 2012
All times are Atlantic Standard Time (UTC−04:00)

Preliminary round

|}

|}

Final round

3rd place

|}

Final

|}

Final standing

Pool G
Venue:  Gimnasio José Beto Remón, Panama City, Panama
Dates: August 17–19, 2012
All times are Eastern Standard Time (UTC−05:00)

|}

|}

Pool H
Venue:  Gimnasio del Polideportivo España, Managua, Nicaragua
Dates: May 18–20, 2012
All times are Central Standard Time (UTC−06:00)

|}

|}

Second round

Pool I
Venue:  UWI Sport & Physical Education Centre, Port of Spain, Trinidad and Tobago
Dates: May 25–26, 2013
All times are Atlantic Standard Time (UTC−04:00)

Preliminary round

|}

|}

Final round

3rd place

|}

Final

|}

Final standing

Pool J
Venue:  International School Auditorium, Willemstad, Curaçao
Dates: May 11–12, 2013
All times are Atlantic Standard Time (UTC−04:00)

Preliminary round

|}

|}

Final round

3rd place

|}

Final

|}

Final standing

Pool K
Venue:  Ronald Charles Basketball Arena, Saint Croix, U.S. Virgin Islands
Dates: May 25–26, 2013
All times are Atlantic Standard Time (UTC−04:00)

Preliminary round

|}

|}

Final round

3rd place

|}

Final

|}

Final standing

Pool L
Venue:  Gimnasio Alfonso Gordillo, Guatemala City, Guatemala
Dates: June 8–9, 2013
All times are Central Standard Time (UTC−06:00)

Preliminary round

|}

|}

Final round

3rd place

|}

Final

|}

Final standing

Pool M
Venue:  Alfred Sangster Auditorium, Kingston, Jamaica
Dates: June 1–2, 2013
All times are Eastern Standard Time (UTC−05:00)

Preliminary round

|}

|}

Final round

3rd place

|}

Final

|}

Final standing

Pool N
Venue:  La Borie Indoor Stadium, St. George's, Grenada
Dates: June 22–23, 2013
All times are Atlantic Standard Time (UTC−04:00)

Preliminary round

|}

|}

Final round

3rd place

|}

Final

|}

Final standing

Third placed teams

Third round

Pool O
Venue:  OTC Sports Center I, Colorado Springs, United States
Dates: May 15–18, 2014
All times are Mountain Daylight Time (UTC−06:00)

Preliminary round

|}

|}

Final round

3rd place

|}

Final

|}

Final standing

Pool P
Venue:  Polideportivo Eleoncio Mercedes, La Romana, Dominican Republic
Dates: May 15–18, 2014
All times are Atlantic Standard Time (UTC−04:00)

Preliminary round

|}

|}

Final round

3rd place

|}

Final

|}

Final standing

Pool Q
Venue:  Coliseo de la Ciudad Deportiva, Havana, Cuba
Dates: May 14–17, 2014
All times are Cuba Daylight Time (UTC−04:00)

Preliminary round

|}

|}

Final round

3rd place

|}

Final

|}

Final standing

Pool R
Venue:  Auditorio Juan Pachín Vicéns, Ponce, Puerto Rico
Dates: May 22–25, 2014
All times are Atlantic Standard Time (UTC−04:00)

Preliminary round

|}

|}

Final round

3rd place

|}

Final

|}

Final standing

Pool S
Venue:  Hershey Centre, Mississauga, Canada
Dates: May 16–19, 2014
All times are Eastern Daylight Time (UTC−04:00)

Preliminary round

|}

|}

Final round

3rd place

|}

Final

|}

Final standing

Final round

Playoff
Venue:  UWI Sport & Physical Education Centre, Port of Spain, Trinidad and Tobago
Dates: July 16–20, 2014
All times are Atlantic Standard Time (UTC−04:00)

References

External links
 2014 World Championship Qualification NORCECA – 1st Round
 2014 World Championship Qualification NORCECA – 2nd Round

2014 FIVB Volleyball Women's World Championship
2012 in volleyball
2013 in volleyball
2014 in volleyball
FIVB Volleyball World Championship qualification